José Israel Barrero (born José Israel García; April 5, 1998) is a Cuban professional baseball shortstop for the Cincinnati Reds of Major League Baseball (MLB). He was known as Jose García before changing his name to José Barrero in 2021.

Career
Barrero played for the Cuban national baseball team in the 2015 U-18 Baseball World Cup and in the Cuban National Series for the Industriales. He signed with the Cincinnati Reds as an international free agent in June 2017.

Barrero made his professional debut in 2018 with the Dayton Dragons. He played 2019 with the Daytona Tortugas and after the season played in the Arizona Fall League. The Reds invited him to their Spring Training in 2020.

Barrero made his MLB debut on August 27, 2020 against the Milwaukee Brewers. He hit .194 with no home runs and 2 RBIs in 24 games for Cincinnati in 2020, and he started the 2021 season with the Chattanooga Lookouts.

On March 20, 2022, it was announced that Barrero would miss at least six weeks with a hamate injury in his left hand/wrist.

Personal life
On May 29, 2021, he changed his name from José García to José Barrero in honor of his mother, who died due to a COVID-19 related illness.

References

External links

1998 births
Living people
Baseball players from Havana
Major League Baseball players from Cuba
Cuban expatriate baseball players in the United States
American sportspeople of Cuban descent
Major League Baseball shortstops
Cincinnati Reds players
Industriales de La Habana players
Dayton Dragons players
Daytona Tortugas players
Glendale Desert Dogs players
Chattanooga Lookouts players
Louisville Bats players